Christine Rossi  (born 1 May 1963) is a French freestyle skier. 

She competed at the FIS Freestyle World Ski Championships 1986 in Tignes, where she won a silver medal in acroski (ski ballet).

She took part at the 1988 Winter Olympics in Calgary, winning the ski ballet, which was a demonstration event at the games.

References

External links 
 

1963 births
Living people
French female freestyle skiers